The Blackmagic Cinema Camera (often simply the Cinema Camera or BMCC) is a digital movie camera developed and manufactured by Blackmagic Design and released on September 4, 2012. It is part of the Cinema Camera family of digital movie cameras and shoots 2.5K video in raw, Apple ProRes, CinemaDNG and Avid DNxHD formats.

History 
At the NAB Show in April 2012, Blackmagic Design announced and demonstrated the Cinema Camera and slated for its release on July with an initial price of US$2,995. However, in August, the release date was delayed for "final stages of Thunderbolt certification and internal testing". A passive Micro Four Thirds model was then announced at IBC in September for release in December, along with a collaboration with Arri for a set of kits exclusively for the camera.

Alongside the announcement of the Pocket Cinema Camera and Production Camera 4K at NAB in April 2013, the price was dropped from its initial value to US$1,995 on August. It was then given an Arri PL model, as well as the Production Camera 4K, in September 2014. On October, a firmware update allowed the cameras to format solid-state drives within the camera. In March 2015, another update added lossless raw capability.

At the NAB Show in April 2018, Blackmagic Design announced and demonstrated the Pocket Cinema Camera 4K at a price of US$1,295. The first in the Pocket Cinema Camera line with the ability to shoot 4K video, this model included a 4/3 image sensor and mount.

In August 2019, Blackmagic Design released the Blackmagic Pocket Cinema Camera 6K with a Super 35 camera sensor and EF mount for US$2,495.

In February 2021, Blackmagic Design released the Blackmagic Pocket Cinema Camera 6K Pro, an updated version of the Pocket Cinema Camera 6K, which features internal ND filters, additional EVF port,   and a 5" high brightness flip-out screen.

In June 2022, the second generation of the 6K model (Pocket Cinema Camera 6K G2) was released, featuring a redesigned body which now resembles the 6K Pro’s and utilizes many features found on the 6K Pro, but was designed without built in ND filters.

Design

Specifications and hardware 
The Cinema Camera can be bought in Canon EF, MFT and Arri PL models, although the EF is the only model native to the Carl Zeiss ZE mount. All models include DaVinci Resolve with purchase. The device also offers 13 stops of dynamic range through every shot.

The Camera has a 5" 800x480 LCD touchscreen display and dedicated buttons that can play and pause, stop, skip, focus and record media, access the menu and to power on the device. It can record raw, CinemaDNG, Apple ProRes and Avid DNxHD onto 2.5K and 1080p resolutions, as well as lossless 2.5K raw, in 23.98, 24, 25, 29.97 and 30 fps.

Software 
The device runs on a proprietary software called Camera Utility, which mainly powers the interface and system. However, unlike most systems which update through firmware over the air, updates to the software must be done on a computer through USB and are obtained through Blackmagic's Support Center. Files shot through the camera can be viewed individually and metadata, such as shot, scene and take numbers, can be assigned to each one. The SSD can also be internally formatted, instead of manually removing it and formatting on another platform, into exFAT and HFS+.

References 

Digital movie cameras
Micro Four Thirds system